Jeannie Linero (born August 28, 1945) is an American film and television actress. She is perhaps best known for playing the role of "Lucy Mancini" in The Godfather (1972) and The Godfather Part III (1990). Her other film credits included roles in Flush (1977) and the remake of Heaven Can Wait (1978).

Linero played the role of "Suzy Marta Rocket" in the short-lived television series Hot L Baltimore. She made guest appearances on such television series as One Day at a Time, Maude, Chico and the Man, Baretta, All in the Family, Laverne & Shirley, Welcome Back, Kotter, Archie Bunker's Place, Mama's Family, and Hill Street Blues.

Filmography

Film

Television

References

External links 

Rotten Tomatoes profile

1945 births
Living people
Place of birth missing (living people)
American film actresses
American television actresses
American soap opera actresses
20th-century American actresses
21st-century American women